Françoaldo Sena de Souza (born 2 March 1976), commonly known as França, is a Brazilian former professional footballer who played as a striker.

Club career
França was born in Codó, Maranhão. After his senior beginnings with lowly Nacional Futebol Clube and Esporte Clube XV de Novembro (Jaú), he moved in 1996 to national powerhouse São Paulo FC, where he proceeded to net eight goals overall in his debut year – even though he did not start regularly – and 182 goals in 323 games during his six-year stay (fourth all-time at the time of his departure); in 1998 and 2000, as the club won the Campeonato Paulista, the player was crowned the league's best scorer, respectively at 12 and 18.

In the 2002 summer, França signed with Bayer 04 Leverkusen from Germany as the team sought replacements for aging Ulf Kirsten (37). In his debut season in the Bundesliga he appeared scarcely, barred by Dimitar Berbatov and Oliver Neuville, netting only once, in his league debut in a 2–4 home loss against VfL Bochum;

In 2003–04, although the pair remained at the BayArena, França received much more playing time, and finished just two goals short of the Bulgarian (14 to 16, in as many matches), adding to this a league-best 13 assists. Additionally, Neuville left the following summer.

França moved to Japan subsequently, joining Kashiwa Reysol, experiencing one relegation and one promotion in his first two years and leaving the club in 2010, aged 34.

International career
França collected eight caps for Brazil during two years, but was never selected to any major tournament. He scored once for the national team; his only goal coming in a friendly against England in May 2000.

Career statistics

Club

International

Honours
São Paulo
Campeonato Paulista: 1998, 2000
Torneio Rio – São Paulo: 2001
Copa Master de CONMEBOL: 1996

Kashiwa Reysol
J.League Division 2: 2010

References

External links

1976 births
Living people
Sportspeople from Maranhão
Brazilian footballers
Association football forwards
Brazil international footballers
Campeonato Brasileiro Série A players
Nacional Futebol Clube players
Esporte Clube XV de Novembro (Jaú) players
São Paulo FC players
Bundesliga players
Bayer 04 Leverkusen players
J1 League players
J2 League players
Kashiwa Reysol players
Yokohama FC players
Brazilian expatriate footballers
Expatriate footballers in Germany
Expatriate footballers in Japan
Brazilian expatriate sportspeople in Germany
Brazilian expatriate sportspeople in Japan